Margarita Alekseyevna Chernomyrdina  (born 6 March 1996) is a Russian footballer who plays as a midfielder for the Russia women's national football team. She was part of the team at the 2016 Algarve Cup. At the club level, she has played for Chertanovo Moscow in Russia.

International goals

References

External links
 

1996 births
Living people
Russian women's footballers
Place of birth missing (living people)
Women's association football forwards
Russia women's international footballers
Universiade silver medalists for Russia
Universiade medalists in football
Medalists at the 2017 Summer Universiade
ZFK CSKA Moscow players
FC Chertanovo Moscow (women) players
Russian Women's Football Championship players
UEFA Women's Euro 2017 players